Owstonia is a genus of marine ray-finned fish belonging to the family Cepolidae, the bandfishes. It is the only genus in the monotypic subfamily Owstoninae. They are found in deep-waters of the Indian and Pacific Ocean.

Taxonomy
Owstonia was described in 1908 by the Japanese ichthyologist Shigeho Tanaka with the type species designated as Owstonia totomiensis due to it being the only species in a monotypic genus at the time of its description. In 1913 Tanaka, along with the American ichthyologists David Starr Jordan and John Otterbein Snyder, created the family Owstonidae for this genus. The family was merged with the Cepolidae as a subfamily in 1956 and is now regarded as a subfamily, Owstoninae, of the Cepolidae. The name of the genus, Owstonia. means "belonging to Owston". This name refers to a specimen of O. totomiensis being found in the collection of Alan Owston.

Species
There are currently 36 recognized species in this genus:
 Owstonia ainonaka Smith-Vaniz & G. D. Johnson, 2016
 Owstonia contodon Smith-Vaniz & G. D. Johnson, 2016
 Owstonia crassa Smith-Vaniz & G. D. Johnson, 2016
 Owstonia dispar Smith-Vaniz & G. D. Johnson, 2016
 Owstonia doryptera (Fowler, 1934)
 Owstonia elongata Smith-Vaniz & G. D. Johnson, 2016
 Owstonia fallax Smith-Vaniz & G. D. Johnson, 2016
 Owstonia geminata Smith-Vaniz & G. D. Johnson, 2016
 Owstonia grammodon (Fowler, 1934)
 Owstonia hastata Smith-Vaniz & G. D. Johnson, 2016
 Owstonia hawaiiensis Smith-Vaniz & G. D. Johnson, 2016
 Owstonia ignota Smith-Vaniz & G. D. Johnson, 2016
 Owstonia japonica Kamohara, 1935
 Owstonia kamoharai Endo, Y. C. Liao & Matsuura, 2015 (Kamohara's bandfish) 
 Owstonia lepiota Smith-Vaniz & G. D. Johnson, 2016
 Owstonia maccullochi Whitley, 1934 (McCulloch's bandfish)
 Owstonia macrophthalma (Fourmanoir, 1985)
 Owstonia melanoptera Smith-Vaniz & G. D. Johnson, 2016
 Owstonia merensis Smith-Vaniz & G. D. Johnson, 2016 
 Owstonia mundyi Smith-Vaniz & G. D. Johnson, 2016
 Owstonia nalani Smith-Vaniz & G. D. Johnson, 2016
 Owstonia nigromarginata (Fourmanoir, 1985)
 Owstonia nudibucca Smith-Vaniz & G. D. Johnson, 2016
 Owstonia psilos Smith-Vaniz & G. D. Johnson, 2016
 Owstonia raredonae Smith-Vaniz & G. D. Johnson, 2016
 Owstonia rhamma Smith-Vaniz & G. D. Johnson, 2016
 Owstonia sarmiento Y. C. Liao, Reyes & K. T. Shao, 2009
 Owstonia scottensis Smith-Vaniz & G. D. Johnson, 2016
 Owstonia sibogae (M. C. W. Weber, 1913) (Comb bandfish)
 Owstonia similis Smith-Vaniz & G. D. Johnson, 2016
 Owstonia simotera (J. L. B. Smith, 1968)
 Owstonia taeniosoma (Kamohara, 1935)
 Owstonia tosaensis Kamohara, 1934
 Owstonia totomiensis S. Tanaka, 1908 (Short-tail bandfish)
 Owstonia weberi (Gilchrist, 1922)
 Owstonia whiteheadi (Talwar, 1973) (Indian bandfish)

Characteristics
Owstonia bandfishes differ from the two genera in the subfamily Cepolinae by being less elongate,  having only 27-33 vertebrae and 19-26 soft rays in their dorsal fin. Their dorsal and anal fins not attached to the lanceoloate caudal fin.

Distribution, habitat and habitat
Owstonia bandfishes are found in the Indo-Pacific region from the eastern coast of Africa as far east as Hawaii. They are found in deep water. Unlike the Cepoline bandfishes the fishes in Owstonia are not, other than one species, burrowers in soft substrates. They are  found over rocky substrates swimming close to the bottom particularly on the upper continental slope, around atolls or  oceanic fragments of crust. The exception is O. taeniosoma which has a more elongated body than its congeners and is found over sand or mud bottoms on the continental shelf.

References

Cepolidae
 
Ray-finned fish genera
Taxa named by Shigeho Tanaka